Dugesia hepta is a species of freshwater triclad endemic to Sardinia.

References

hepta
Animals described in 1981
Endemic fauna of Sardinia